Time and Mr. Bass is a 1967 children's science fiction novel by Canadian author Eleanor Cameron. The novel followed The Wonderful Flight to the Mushroom Planet (1954), Stowaway to the Mushroom Planet (1956), Mr. Bass's Planetoid (1958), A Mystery for Mr. Bass (1960), Jewels from the Moon and the Meteor That Couldn't Stay (1964), and was illustrated by Fred H. Meise. It is the concluding installment of her Mushroom Planet series.

See also 
 The Wonderful Flight to the Mushroom Planet, the first book in the series

External links 
https://web.archive.org/web/20160303183151/http://www.iblist.com/book7709.htm

1967 Canadian novels
1967 science fiction novels
Canadian science fiction novels
Children's science fiction novels
Novels by Eleanor Cameron
Little, Brown and Company books
Novels set in Wales
1967 children's books